Tibet Through the Red Box is a 2004 theatrical adaptation of author Peter Sis' children's book of the same title by American playwright David Henry Hwang. It tells of a boy growing up in Prague into the 1950s. It was commissioned by the Seattle Children's Theatre, where it opened on January 30, 2004. It was directed by Francesca Zambello.

The script is published by Playscripts, Inc.

References

Plays by David Henry Hwang
2004 plays